An Innocent Witch is a 1965 Japanese drama film directed by Heinosuke Gosho. It is based on the novel Reiba no onna by Hajime Ogawa. Called "uncharaceristically harsh" for the director by Gosho biographer Arthur Nolletti, the film, produced by Gosho's own production company, was not a commercial success, but is critically acclaimed by film historians.

Plot
During the annual religious festivities at Mount Osore, widow Kikuno joins a medium to contact the spirit of her deceased daughter Ayako and ask her for forgiveness. The film switches back to 20 years earlier when in 1937, Ayako, a poor fisherman's daughter from Ōma, is sold to a brothel as her ill father can't support the family anymore. She is violently deflowered by rich merchant Yamasan, who becomes her regular customer. One year later, she meets Kanjiro, a young student, who becomes another regular customer and to whom she develops an emotional bond. It turns out that Kanjiro is Yamasan's son, but while Yamasan has no problem sharing her with his son, Kanjiro is reluctant to her meeting his father. After Yamasan dies of a heart attack during a visit to Ayako and Kanjiro commits suicide in the military service, Ayako is stigmatised as bringing bad luck. Kanichi, a new customer, reveals himself as Kanjiro's older brother, who insists that the rumours surrounding Ayako are pure superstition. Ayako and Kanichi become lovers, but before his plan to go to Tokyo together is realised, he is killed by an army truck driver who refuses to stop for him. When the brothel's owners demand her leaving the house because she might be possessed by an evil spirit, Ayako, out of desperation, agrees to have an exorcism performed on her. Severely beaten during the brutal exorcism ritual, Ayako finally dies.

Cast
Jitsuko Yoshimura as Ayako
Keizō Kawasaki as Kanichi
Taiji Tonoyama as Yamasan
Minori Terada as Kanjiro
Eijirō Tōno as shaman
Kin Sugai as Kikuno, Ayako's mother
Chieko Nakakita as brothel owner
Misako Tominaga
Kumeko Urabe

Legacy
Ranked seventh on Kinema Junpo's annual Best Ten film list in 1965, An Innocent Witch was part of the 1989–1990 retrospective on Heinosuke Gosho held by the Japan Society and the Museum of Modern Art, New York.

References

External links

1965 films
1965 drama films
1960s Japanese-language films
Japanese drama films
Films based on Japanese novels
Films directed by Heinosuke Gosho
1960s Japanese films